Netbooks are small laptops, with screen sizes between approximately 7 and 12 inches and low power consumption. They use either an SSD (solid state disk) or a HDD (hard disk drive) for storage, have up to 2 gigabytes of RAM (but often less), lack an optical disk drive, and usually have USB, Ethernet, WiFi and often Bluetooth connectivity. The name emphasizes their use as portable Internet appliances.

Netbook distributions
There are special Linux distributions, called netbook distributions, for these machines. All such distributions purport to be optimized for use with small, low-resolution displays. They tend to include a broad mix of VOIP and web-focused tools, including proprietary applications rarely seen installed by default by mainstream desktop distributions. For instance, Nokia Maemo and Asus' customized Xandros both ship with Skype and Adobe Flash installed, and Ubuntu's Netbook Edition offers the option to do the same for OEMs.

Comparison

Features

Specific Features

Google Trends
While no public numbers measuring the install-base of these operating systems are available, Google Trends data on a handful of them indicate their relative popularity:

References

See also

Android
List of Linux distributions that run from RAM
List of tools to create Live USB systems

 
Netbooks
Linux distributions